Veratrole alcohol (veratryl alcohol) is an organic compound related to veratrole and also to benzyl alcohol. It can be obtained by reduction of veratraldehyde. Veratrole alcohol is the raw material for the synthesis of cyclotriveratrylene which is used in host–guest chemistry.
It is a secondary metabolite of some white rot fungi and is believed to play a role in their degradation of lignin.

References 

Phenol ethers
Primary alcohols